, better known as , is a Japanese actress and former Top Star otokoyaku (an actress who plays male roles) of the Japanese Takarazuka Revue's Moon Troupe.

Filmography

Stage

TV series

Internet series

Films

Japanese dub

References

External links
 
 
  
  

Japanese film actresses
Japanese musical theatre actresses
Japanese television actresses
1956 births
Living people
Actors from Hyōgo Prefecture
20th-century Japanese actresses
20th-century Japanese women singers
20th-century Japanese singers
21st-century Japanese actresses
21st-century Japanese women singers
21st-century Japanese singers